Harmanpreet Singh  is an Indian field hockey player who plays as a defender for the Indian national team and also captains the national team. He was part of the hockey team that won the bronze medal for India in Tokyo 2020 Summer Olympic Games.

He was named in the Indian squad for the 2016 Summer Olympics.

He was named men's 'Player of the Year' at FIH Player of the Year Awards for the year 2020–2021. and 2021–2022.

Junior career
Singh made his debut for India Junior Team against New Zealand. He scored 9 goals at the 2014 Sultan of Johor Cup. His team won the tournament by defeating Great Britain 2–1 in the final. For his outstanding performances he was awarded Man of the Tournament Award. He scored 4 goals at 2015 Sultan of Johor Cup. Unfortunately his team lost in the final to Great Britain in penalties 3-4 after a 2–2 draw. He was the member of the team which won 2015 Men's Hockey Junior Asia Cup. He was the highest goalscorer of the tournament, he scored 14 goals. After his debut appearance at the Olympics, he was selected for 2016 Men's Hockey Junior World Cup. Singh scored a crucial 66th-minute goal against Spain which helped his team win the match 2-1 and reach the semi-finals. His team won the tournament by defeating Belgium in the final 2–1. He scored 3 goals in the tournament.

Senior career

2015
Harmanpreet Singh received his maiden call-up for senior team in April 2015 when he was selected for the 3 match bilateral series against Japan. But he was dropped from the team for next tournament which was the 2014–15 Men's FIH Hockey World League Semifinals.

2016
Singh returned to the team for 2016 Sultan Azlan Shah Cup. He scored his 1st ever goal for national team against the Japanese team which helped his team win the match 2–1. He then scored one goal in the match against Canada which was won by his team 3–1. He scored only 2 goals in the tournament. His team had a crushing defeat to Australia in the final 4–0.

Harmanpreet was then retained in the squad for 2016 Men's Hockey Champions Trophy. In the 1st match against Germany, scored a goal in the 32nd minute but the match ended in a 3–3 draw and in the next match against Great Britain he scored a goal in the 34th minute which helped his team win the match 2–1. The final against Australia ended in a 0–0 draw. In the penalty shootout only Harmanpreet managed to score. His team lost the final in 3–1 on penalties. Singh scored 2 goals in the tournament and won the Young Player of the Tournament award.

He was named in the Indian squad for 2016 Olympics. Harmanpreet gave a disappointing performance at the Rio Olympics 2016. He failed to score a single goal. His coach claimed that he had unperformed and had not done justice to the outstanding talent and prowess that he possessed as a player. His team lost to Belgium in  the Quarter-finals 1-3 after barely qualify for knockout  stage. Out of 6 games, India managed to win only 2 but lost out on 3, which was a disappointing conclusion to their Olympics’ campaign. He was dropped from the team for 2016 Men's Asian Champions Trophy and 4 Nations Invitational Tournament after a disastrous Olympics campaign.

2017
After his good performances at the 2016 Men's Hockey Junior World Cup, Singh again returned to the national team for 2017 Sultan Azlan Shah Cup. He scored 2 goals(27th minute and 47th minute) in the match against New Zealand which was won by his team comfortably 3–0. He then was the lone scorer(26th minute) in the match against Australia which his team lost 1–3. He scored 3 goals in the tournament and his team finished 3rd.

Harmanpreet Singh was named in squad for 2016–17 Men's FIH Hockey World League Semifinals.

He was selected for 2017 Men's Hockey Asia Cup. He scored 2 goals in the 35th minute and 48th minute in the 1st match against Japan. India easily won the match 5–1. He again scored 2 goals in the next match against Bangladesh in the 28th and 47th minute. Hus team again easily win the match 7–0. He then scored a goal in the 45th minute of match against arch-rivals Pakistan which was also won by his team 3–1. His team topped the Pool and qualified for Super 4s stages. He scored a goal in the 19th minute in a thrashing win over of 6–1 over Malaysia. He then scored a goal in the 51 minute in the match against Pakistan which was won by his team 4–0 to enter the finals. His team won the tournament by defeating Malaysia 2–1 in the final to win their 3rd title. Harmanpreet was joint high scorer with Malaysian Faizal Saari with 7 goals.

2022
In 2021–22 Men's FIH Pro League match against England, Harmanpreet scored his 100th goal. He went to score a Hat-trick in the same match which helped his team to win the match 4–3. He then scored 2 goals in the match against Germany which helped his team win the match 3–0.

Club career
The young drag-flicker was bought by Dabang Mumbai for $51000 in the 2015 Hockey India League, he scored 5 goals in his first edition. He went on to win the Ponty Chadha award for the most promising player of the tournament in 2015. Mumbai Dabangs retained him for the 2016 edition. He scored only 2 goals in the whole season but his good defensive skills helped to retain him. He scored 6 goals in 2017 edition. He won the Upcoming Player of the Tournament award.

References

External links
Harmanpreet Singh at Hockey India

1996 births
Living people
Field hockey players from Amritsar
Indian male field hockey players
Male field hockey defenders
Olympic field hockey players of India
Field hockey players at the 2016 Summer Olympics
Field hockey players at the 2020 Summer Olympics
Field hockey players at the 2018 Commonwealth Games
Field hockey players at the 2018 Asian Games
2018 Men's Hockey World Cup players
Asian Games bronze medalists for India
Asian Games medalists in field hockey
Medalists at the 2018 Asian Games
Olympic bronze medalists for India
Medalists at the 2020 Summer Olympics
Olympic medalists in field hockey
Field hockey players at the 2022 Commonwealth Games
Commonwealth Games silver medallists for India
Commonwealth Games medallists in field hockey
Recipients of the Arjuna Award
2023 Men's FIH Hockey World Cup players
Medallists at the 2022 Commonwealth Games